John Eagleton is a South African former professional tennis player.

Eagleton, a South African junior champion, was a collegiate tennis player for the University of Miami, earning four All-American selections. In the late 1970s he competed professionally and made three doubles main draw appearance at the US Open, reaching the second round in 1978 partnering Deon Joubert. He was the personal coach of doubles specialist Ellis Ferreira and the two later set up a tennis academy together in Longboat Key, Florida.

References

External links
 
 

Year of birth missing (living people)
Living people
South African male tennis players
South African tennis coaches
Miami Hurricanes men's tennis players